Edward Abbott may refer to:
Edward Abbott (governor) (fl. 1775–1778), rebuilt Fort Vincennes, Indiana
Edward Abbott (jurist) (1766–1832), Australian soldier, politician and judge
Edward Gilbert Abbott (1825–1855), American patient upon whom ether was demonstrated
Edward Abbott (priest) (1841–1908), American Christian minister
Edward Lyman Abbott (1891–1918), Canadian athlete after whom the Abbott Cup is named
Edward Abbott (Master of Magdalene College) (died 1746)